White Water Fury is a 2000 Swedish thriller film directed by Jon Lindström and starring Emil Forselius, Rafael Edholm, and Alexander Skarsgård.

Plot 
White Water Fury follows four men on a kayaking trip. Later on in the journey they meet the two sisters: Marie and Susanne. They decide to camp together and after a wild night the youngest sister Susanne is gone. While the men back to their everyday lives, Marie is worried about where her sister has gone. The canoe that belonged to the sisters is found crushed on the river a short distance from the campsite. Järngänget, as the men call themselves, become more nervous and start to question each other's stories as to what really happened that fateful night.

Cast
Emil Forselius as Lukas
Rafael Edholm as Simon
Alexander Skarsgård as Anders
Peter Lorentzon as John
Yaba Holst as Marie
Josephine Bornebusch as Susanne
Per Oscarsson as Åke
Marika Lagercrantz as Lindberg
Agneta Ekmanner as mother
Görel Crona as Stina
Bill Skarsgård as Klasse
Marie Ahl as Astrid
Thomas Oredsson as Harald
Göran Forsmark as municipal chairman

Production and release 
Directed by Jon Lindstrom, it was released on April 7, 2000. Bill Skasrgard, in his feature film appearance, plays the younger brother, age 9, of Alexander Skarsgard's character, his real brother.

References

External links

2000 films
2000s Swedish-language films
2000s thriller films
Swedish thriller films
2000s Swedish films